Oliver Gunning (born 3 October 1996) is an Irish cricketer. He made his Twenty20 debut for Munster Reds in the 2018 Inter-Provincial Trophy on 6 July 2018.

References

External links
 

1996 births
Living people
Irish cricketers
Place of birth missing (living people)
Munster Reds cricketers